Howard Hershey Carl (June 7, 1938 – October 24, 2005) was an American basketball player.

Born in Chicago, Illinois, he played collegiately for DePaul University.

He was selected by the Chicago Packers in the 5th round (50th pick overall) of the 1961 NBA draft.

He played for the Packers (1961–62) in the NBA for 31 games.

See also
 List of shortest players in National Basketball Association history

External links

1938 births
2005 deaths
Basketball players from Chicago
Chicago Packers draft picks
Chicago Packers players
DePaul Blue Demons men's basketball players
American men's basketball players
Point guards